Weatherby Lake is a city in Platte County, Missouri and is part of the Kansas City metropolitan area within the United States, which borders Kansas City. The population was 1,723 as of the 2010 census.

Geography
Weatherby Lake is located at  (39.238602, -94.697879).

The city is named after Glenn Weatherby, who along with other developers built what was then known as the Lakeview Subdivision. A 274 acre lake, also named Weatherby Lake, was created by the construction of a dam completed in 1937.  The town encompasses the lake.

Demographics

2010 census
As of the census of 2010, there were 1,723 people, 699 households, and 564 families living in the city. The racial makeup of the city was 95.1% White, 0.8% African American, 0.5% Native American, 1.5% Asian, 0.1% Pacific Islander, 0.7% from other races, and 1.4% from two or more races. Hispanic or Latino of any race were 3.2% of the population.

There were 699 households, of which 25.9% had children under the age of 18 living with them, 73.0% were married couples living together, 5.4% had a female householder with no husband present, 2.3% had a male householder with no wife present, and 19.3% were non-families. 16.7% of all households were made up of individuals, and 6.5% had someone living alone who was 65 years of age or older. The average household size was 2.45 and the average family size was 2.73.

The median age in the city was 52.7 years. 18.7% of residents were under the age of 18; 4.1% were between the ages of 18 and 24; 14.2% were from 25 to 44; 40.8% were from 45 to 64; and 22.2% were 65 years of age or older. The gender makeup of the city was 49.0% male and 51.0% female.

2000 census
As of the census of 2000, there were 1,873 people, 700 households, and 588 families living in the city. The population density was 1,810.5 people per square mile (702.1/km). There were 722 housing units at an average density of 697.9 per square mile (270.6/km). The racial makeup of the city was 96.64% White, 1.07% African American, 0.32% Native American, 0.91% Asian, 0.16% from other races, and 0.91% from two or more races. Hispanic or Latino of any race were 1.66% of the population.

There were 700 households, out of which 32.7% had children under the age of 18 living with them, 78.9% were married couples living together, 3.1% had a female householder with no husband present, and 15.9% were non-families. 12.7% of all households were made up of individuals, and 2.4% had someone living alone who was 65 years of age or older. The average household size was 2.67 and the average family size was 2.88.

In the city, the population was spread out, with 23.0% under the age of 18, 5.7% from 18 to 24, 20.1% from 25 to 44, 41.4% from 45 to 64, and 9.9% who were 65 years of age or older. The median age was 46 years. For every 100 females, there were 101.4 males. For every 100 females age 18 and over, there were 100.4 males.

The median income for a household in the city was $88,030, and the median income for a family was $94,643. Males had a median income of $61,042 versus $37,386 for females. The per capita income for the city was $37,722. About 0.7% of families and 1.5% of the population were below the poverty line, including 2.7% of those under age 18 and none of those age 65 or over.

Religion
There are many religions in Kansas City, however, the two ecclesiastical ones are the Roman Catholic and Eastern Orthodox, followed by Protestant and other denominations.
The proportion of Kansas City area residents with a known religious affiliation is 50.75%. The most common religious denominations in the area are:

 None/No affiliation 49.25%
 Catholic 13.2%
 Baptists 10.4%
 Other Christian 10.3%
 Methodist 6.0%
 Pentecostal 2.7%
 Latter-day Saint 2.5%
 Lutheran 2.3%
 Presbyterian 1.7%
 Judaism 0.4%
 Eastern religions 0.4%
 Islam 0.4%

References

Cities in Platte County, Missouri
Cities in Missouri